The Quad City Mallards were a minor professional ice hockey team in the United Hockey League. The Mallards played their home games at The MARK of the Quad Cities in Moline, Illinois. They won the Colonial Cup playoff championship in 1997, 1998, and 2001, as well as the Tarry Cup regular season championship in 1998, 2000, 2001, and 2002. The Mallards won 50 or more games in six consecutive seasons, from 1996–97 to 2001–02, a professional hockey record. They were also known for never having missed the playoffs in their years of existence.  Historically, the Mallards enjoyed spirited rivalries with the Flint Generals, Muskegon Fury, and Rockford IceHogs.

In response to the Calgary Flames's decision to relocate their American Hockey League affiliate from Omaha, Nebraska, to Moline before the start of the 2007–08 season, the Mallards announced that they would cease operations. The franchise that replaced them, the Quad City Flames, lasted two seasons before that team moved to Abbotsford, British Columbia, in 2009. Former team owner Chris Lencheski, along with business partner Steve Ryan, brought the Mallards back to the Quad Cities in the International Hockey League in 2009.

Championships

Season-by-season results

 Season results were compiled from hockeydb.com and Pointstreak.com.

Coaches

 Season results were compiled from hockeydb.com .

Retired numbers
 #22 - Mark McFarlane
 #77 - Kerry Toporowski
 #55 - Steve Gibson
 #18 - Glenn Stewart
 #16 - Hugo Proulx

References

Mallards
Defunct United Hockey League teams
Ice hockey teams in Illinois
Defunct ice hockey teams in Illinois
Ice hockey clubs established in 1995
Sports clubs disestablished in 2007

fr:Mallards de Quad City